Paribhavam is a 2009 Malayalam film directed by K. A. Devaraj starring Abhilash and Kripa.

Plot 
Paribhavam tells the story of Chandu and Nandini who are orphans.

Nandini had to come back to Kerala after her parents were killed in US. She develops a fascination for a mute boy and soon moves into the city with him. Their public displays of affection makes the locals agitate against them.

Cast 
 Abhilash as Chandu
 Kripa as Nandini
 Machan Varghese
 Kulappulli Leela
 Laxmi Sharma
 Jagathy Sreekumar
 Jagadish
 Mala Aravindan
 Indrans
 Narayanankutty
 K K Jayesh
 Shiju
 Sunil Kecheri

References

External links
 http://www.nowrunning.com/movie/4907/malayalam/paribhavam/index.htm
 https://web.archive.org/web/20090531162507/http://popcorn.oneindia.in/title/1487/paribhavam.html
 https://web.archive.org/web/20110708155058/http://www.cinecurry.com/movie/malayalam/paribhavam

2009 films
2000s Malayalam-language films